Gerson Merton Friedman (June 6, 1932 – November 12, 2022), known professionally as Budd Friedman, was an American actor and comedian, as well as the founder and original proprietor and MC of the Improvisation Comedy Club, which opened in 1963, on West 44th Street near the SE corner of 9th Avenue, in the Hell's Kitchen neighborhood of Manhattan. He was instrumental in launching the comedy careers of Rodney Dangerfield, Richard Lewis, Robert Klein, Jay Leno, Andy Kaufman, Freddie Prinze, Steve Landesberg, Jimmie Walker, and for a brief time, managed Bette Midler at the early stages of her career. It was with Friedman's help and guidance that Ms. Midler first appeared on The Tonight Show.

He was also an actor and producer. Friedman also opened Improv clubs at other locations including Pechanga Resort and Casino in Temecula, California, on March 23, 2007, in Los Angeles in 1975, and in Fantasy Springs Resort and Casino in Indio, California.

Korean War
Friedman served in the infantry in the U.S. Army during the Korean War. He was wounded by an enemy grenade during his first day in action in the summer of 1953 while his unit was assaulting Pork Chop Hill. He was awarded the Purple Heart and the Combat Infantryman Badge (CIB). The ceasefire went into effect while he was still recuperating in the hospital.

Personal life and death
Friedman married Alix Friedman (at the time name Alex Mark) in 1981 and remained with her for an unconfirmed number of years. They had 4 children named Zoe, Beth, Ross, and Dax. Friedman died in Los Angeles on November 12, 2022, at the age of 90 from heart failure.

Filmography

Actor
 National Lampoon's Funny Money (2003) ... as Announcer
 Man on the Moon (1999) ... as Himself
 Star 80 (1983) ... as Emcee
 An Evening at the Improv (1982) ... as Host

Producer
 National Lampoon's Funny Money (2003) ... executive producer
 An Evening at the Improv (1982) ... executive producer

Awards and recognition 
 Norwich (Connecticut) Native Son Award (1980)
 Golden Goody Award (2013)

See also
The Improv

References

External links
 

1932 births
2022 deaths
Male actors from Connecticut
Military personnel from Norwich, Connecticut
American male film actors
20th-century American male actors